Mark Gundelach (born 7 January 1992) is a Danish professional footballer who plays as a right-back.

Club career
On 27 November 2011, Gundelach scored his first senior goal for Nordsjælland in a 2–1 win over Silkeborg.

On 22 June 2019, he joined HB Køge.

International career
Gundelach was part of the Danish under-20 team that won the 2011 Milk Cup in Northern Ireland.

Honours

Nordsjælland
 Danish Superliga: 2011–12

Denmark U20
 Milk Cup Elite: 2011

References

External links
 Profile at DBU.dk 
 Official Danish Superliga stats 
 

1992 births
Living people
Danish men's footballers
Danish expatriate men's footballers
Association football defenders
People from Egedal Municipality
Denmark youth international footballers
Denmark under-21 international footballers
FC Nordsjælland players
SønderjyskE Fodbold players
HB Køge players
FC Roskilde players
Knattspyrnufélag Akureyrar players
Fremad Amager players
Danish Superliga players
Danish 1st Division players
Danish expatriate sportspeople in Iceland
Expatriate footballers in Iceland
Sportspeople from the Capital Region of Denmark